Longlevens Association Football Club is a football club based in the Longlevens suburb of Gloucester, Gloucestershire, England.

History
The club was established in 1954 and joined Division Four of the North Gloucestershire League. In 1968 they moved up to the Gloucestershire Northern Senior League. The club were Division One champions in 2008–09, and after a third-place finish in 2010–11 they were promoted to the Gloucestershire County League.

Longlevens were Gloucestershire County League champions in 2012–13. The following season saw them win the League Cup and retain the league title, resulting in promotion to Division One West of the Hellenic League. They went on to win Division One West in 2014–15, earning promotion to the Premier Division.

Honours
Hellenic League
Division One West champions 2014–15
Gloucestershire County League
Champions 2012–13, 2013–14
League Cup winners 2013–14
Gloucestershire Northern Senior League
Division One champions 2008–09
North Gloucestershire League
Division Four champions 1954–55

Records
Best FA Cup performance: Second qualifying round, 2021–22
Best FA Vase performance: First round, 2017–18

References

External links

Football clubs in England
Football clubs in Gloucestershire
1954 establishments in England
Association football clubs established in 1954
North Gloucestershire Association Football League
Gloucestershire Northern Senior League
Gloucestershire County Football League
Hellenic Football League